DDS may refer to:

Arts and media
Digimon Data Squad, season 5 of the anime Digimon
Shin Megami Tensei: Digital Devil Saga, a 2004 video game spun off from the Shin Megami Tensei series
Dmitri Dmitriyevich Shostakovich, Russian composer
Death's Dynamic Shroud, American electronic and vaporwave trio

Organizations

Government agencies
Disability Determination Service, a state agency in the United States that determines eligibility for federal disability benefits
Department of Driver Services, also known as Department of Motor Vehicles

Private organizations
Davao Death Squad, a vigilante group in Davao City, Philippines
Davidson Day School, a pre-K–12 school in Davidson, North Carolina, United States
De Danske Skytteforeninger, a Danish sports organization
Diehard Duterte Supporters, supporters of Rodrigo Duterte, 16th president of the Philippines
Donovan Data Systems, a software and computer services company
Dutchess Day School, private pre-K through 8th grade school in Millbrook, New York, United States

Science and technology

Chemistry
Dimethyldichlorosilane, an organosilicon compound
Dammarenediol II synthase, an enzyme

Computing and information technology
Data Design System, a CAD software system
Direct Digital Synthesis, a method for generation of periodic digital signals
Direct digital synthesizer, used for creating arbitrary waveforms from a reference clock
Data Definition Specification, in software data management
Data Description Specifications, in AS/400 programming
Data Distribution Service, an Object Management Group standard for publish/subscribe middleware for distributed systems
Data dictionary system of ICL's VME operating system; see ICL VME#QuickBuild
Dataphone Digital Service or Digital Data System, types of leased line
Digital Data Storage, a storage tape format related to Digital Audio Tape (DAT)
Dimensional Data Storage
DirectDraw Surface, .dds texture files
Dynamic digital signage

Medicine
Dapsone, also known as diaminodiphenyl sulfone (DDS), an antibiotic commonly used for the treatment of leprosy
Doctor of Dental Surgery, an academic degree
Dopamine dysregulation syndrome, a condition connected with treatment for Parkinson's disease
Drug delivery systems, how drugs are delivered to relevant areas or tissues

Other uses in science and technology
Dark dune spot, a feature of the Martian landscape
Deflation Detection System, on motor vehicle tires
Dry deck shelter, a module that allows divers easy exit and entrance while a submarine is submerged

Other uses
Dewey Decimal Classification, often called the Dewey Decimal System
Direct Delivery Scheme, of the Society of Independent Brewers
Dmitri Dmitriyevich Shostakovich, Russian composer